Buck Alamo or (A Phantasmagorical Ballad), or simply Buck Alamo, is a 2020 American film written and directed by Ben Epstein and starring Sonny Carl Davis, Lorelei Linklater, Chase Joliet, Kriston Woodreaux, Lee Eddy, C.K. McFarland, James Epstein, George Ensle and Bruce Dern.

Cast
Sonny Carl Davis
Lorelei Linklater
Lee Eddy
Kriston Woodreaux
Chase Joliet
George Ensle
James Epstein
C.K. McFarland
Bruce Dern

Release
The film premiered at the Oldenburg International Film Festival on September 18, 2020.

Reception
The film has  rating on Rotten Tomatoes.  Lorry Kikta of Film Threat gave the film an 8 out of 10.

Shelagh Rowan-Legg of Screen Anarchy gave the film a positive review and wrote, "...Davis imbues Eli with a deep heart and a soul that is as poetic as it is caustic."

References

External links
 
 

American Western (genre) musical films
2020s English-language films
2020s American films